Manfred Weinreich (born 28 September 1946) is a German rower who represented West Germany.

He competed at the 1968 Summer Olympics in Mexico City with the men's coxless four where they came sixth. At the 1969 European Rowing Championships in Klagenfurt, he won bronze with the men's eight.

References

1946 births
Living people
German male rowers
Olympic rowers of West Germany
Rowers at the 1968 Summer Olympics
People from Aurich (district)
European Rowing Championships medalists
Sportspeople from Lower Saxony